Myohla may refer to several places in Burma:

Myohla, Kale
Myohla, Shwegu